Leptosiphon nudatus (syn. Linanthus nudatus) is a species of flowering plant in the phlox family known by the common name Tehachapi linanthus.

Distribution
It is endemic to California, where it is known only from the Tehachapi Mountains and the southern peaks of the Sierra Nevada. It grows in chaparral, woodlands, and other local mountain habitat.

Description
This is an annual herb producing a thin, hairy stem up to 30 centimeters tall. The hairy, glandular leaves are partially divided into needle-like linear lobes. The inflorescence is a head of a few flowers with hairy white tubes up to a centimeter long and white or pink corollas about a centimeter wide.

External links
Calflora Database: Leptosiphon nudatus (Tehachapi linanthus)
 Jepson Manual eFlora (TJM2) treatment of Leptosiphon nudatus

nudatus
Endemic flora of California
Flora of the Sierra Nevada (United States)
Natural history of the California chaparral and woodlands
Natural history of the Transverse Ranges
~
Flora without expected TNC conservation status